The Power of Negative Thinking: B-Sides & Rarities is a box set compilation album by the noise pop band The Jesus and Mary Chain, released in 2008. It consists of material from the Barbed Wire Kisses, The Sound of Speed and The Jesus And Mary Chain Hate Rock 'n' Roll compilations, alongside unreleased tracks and rarities from throughout their career; including early performances, unheard demos, re-mixes, alternate versions of some songs and bootleg recordings.

Track listing

Personnel
 Vanessa Atkins – Editorial Supervision
 Glenn A. Baker – Photography
 Paul Barber – Project Assistant
 Barry Blacker – Drums
 P.G. Brunelli – Photography
 Andrew Catlin – Photography
 Murray Dalglish – Drums
 Brad Davidson – Bass
 Donna DeChristopher – Project Assistant
 Geoff Donkin – Drums
 Steve Double – Photography
 Terry Edwards – Trumpet
 Casey Estevez – Package Supervision
 Dave Evans – Rhythm guitar
 Dele Fadele – Liner Notes
 Sheryl Farber – Project Assistant
 Lyn Fey – Project Assistant
 Lincoln Fong – Bass
 Joe Foster – Producer
 Bobby Gillespie – Drums
 Steven P. Gorman – Photo Research
 Dick Green – Bass
 Stephen Hague – Producer
 Douglas Hart – Bass
 Dan Hersch – Remastering
 Martin Hewes – Drums
 Robin Hurley – Project Assistant
 Wendy Idele – Photography
 Bill Inglot – Compilation Producer, Remastering
 Ivan Ivan – Remixing
 The Jesus and Mary Chain – Producer
 Philip King – Bass
 Gie Knaeps – Photography
 Masaki Koike – Art Direction, Design
 John Loder – Producer, Engineer
 Ben Lurie – Bass, Rhythm guitar, background vocals
 Shane MacGowan – Vocals
 Ross Marino – Photography, Cover Photo
 Patrick Milligan – Discographical Annotation
 Steve Monti – Drums
 John J. Moore – Drums, Rhythm guitar
 Kenny Nemes – Product Manager
 Karen Parker – background vocals
 Matthew Parkin – Bass
 Steve Peck – Engineer
 Joshua Petker – Art Supervisor
 James Pinker – Drums
 David Ponak – Project Assistant
 Alessandra Quaranta – Photo Research
 Jim Reid – Guitar, Vocals, Producer, Instrumentation
 Julie Reid – Project Assistant
 Linda Reid – Vocals
 William Reid – Guitar, Vocals, Producer, Instrumentation
 Paul Rider – Photography
 Ebet Roberts – Photography
 Nick Sanderson – Drums
 Hope Sandoval – Vocals
 Tom Sheehan – Photography
 Nina Talikka – Research Assistant
 Richard Thomas – Drums
 Phil Ward-Large – Producer
 Scott Webber – Project Assistant
 Kevin Westenberg – Photography
 Mason Williams – Compilation Producer
 Steve Woolard – Project Assistant

References

The Jesus and Mary Chain compilation albums
B-side compilation albums
2008 compilation albums
Blanco y Negro Records compilation albums